Bribie Island North is a locality  on Bribie Island in the Sunshine Coast Region, Queensland, Australia.

It is the only part of Bribie Island in the Sunshine Coast Region with all the rest of the Bribie Island being part of the Moreton Bay Region.

Geography

As the name suggests, Bribie Island North is the northerly peninsula of Bribie Island. It lies very close to the mainland, narrowly separated by the Pumicestone Passage which forms the western border of the locality, while the eastern border is the Pacific Ocean. To the north, it tapers to a long low narrow sandspit. The locality is undeveloped land, most of it being within the Bribie Island National Park.

This section of the Pumicestone Passage is very narrow and very shallow (less than ) with shifting sand and mud banks, which makes the northern sandspit highly dynamic in shape through natural processes of sand/mud buildup and erosion. During storms, waves may cross over the sandspit from the Coral Sea into the Pumicestone Passage, with the potential to break through the sandspit to create new entrances to Pumicestone Passage. The creation of new entrances would impact on the Caloundra suburbs of Golden Beach and Pelican Waters which would then be exposed more directly to the stronger wave action of the Coral Sea as opposed to the calmer waters of the Pumicestone Passage.

In December 2020 wild weather began creating channels from the ocean through the northern sandspit into Pumicestone Passage.

History 

Heritage listings
Bribie Island North has a number of heritage sites, including:
 Bribie Island Second World War Fortifications

References

External links 

 

Suburbs of the Sunshine Coast Region
Localities in Queensland